Biraul Railway Station Code is BIRL, is a Railway Station in Darbhanga District of Bihar, state of India. It is under the administrative control of the Samastipur Division of the East Central Railway Zone of the Indian Railways. Here are some trains that are passing through the Biraul Railway Station like BIRL - DBG Passenger, BIRL- DBG Demu, DBG - BIRL Passenger, BIRL - SKI Passenger, DBG - BIRL Demu, and many more.

Platforms
There are two platforms in Biraul Railway Station.

Nearest airports
The nearest airports to Biraul Railway Station are:
 Vidyapati Airport
 Lok Nayak Jayaprakash Airport, Patna

See also
 Darbhanga

References

Samastipur railway division
Railway stations in Darbhanga district
Transport in Darbhanga